Cedrol is a sesquiterpene alcohol found in the essential oil of conifers (cedar oil), especially in the genera Cupressus (cypress) and Juniperus (juniper). It has also been identified in Origanum onites, a plant related to oregano. Its main uses are in the chemistry of aroma compounds. It makes up about 19% of cedarwood oil Texas and 15.8% of cedarwood oil Virginia.

Cedrol has not been proven to be toxic in humans. It has been shown to have antioxidant and antiinflammatory along with other beneficial effects. In skin sensitization tests 2/20 people showed negative effects, and on the second test there was no sensitivity found. This compound and ones similar have been found to have antiseptic, anti-inflammatory, antispasmodic, tonic, astringent, diuretic, sedative, insecticidal, and antifungal activities in vitro. These compounds are used globally in traditional medicine and cosmetics. Results of a 2015 study suggest that cedrol strongly attracts pregnant female mosquitoes after they have fed, which can be used to create cedrol-baited traps.

See also 
 Cedrene, another component of cedar oil

References 

Sesquiterpenes